Round Top or Roundtop is the name of several summits, notably:

In the United States

Northeastern US
 Round Top (New York), a Catskills summit of Kaaterskill High Peak
 Big Round Top, a hill in the Battle of Gettysburg
 Little Round Top, an important hill in the Battle of Gettysburg
 Roundtop (York County, Pennsylvania), a hill, home of the Roundtop Mountain Resort

Southeastern US
 Round Top (Georgia), a peak on the Appalachian Trail in Georgia
 Round Top Mountain (Arkansas), a summit in Polk County,
 Round Top Mountain (Tennessee), in the Unaka Range of Sevier County,

Western US
 Little Round Top (California), a triple watershed point on the Sierra Crest
 Round Top (Alpine County, California), the highest peak in the Mokelumne Wilderness at 
 Round Top (Contra Costa County, California), an extinct volcano in the Berkeley Hills of California, United States
 Round Top (Oregon), a mountain of the Northern Oregon Coast Range
 Round Top Mountain (Texas), mountain peak in the Trans-Pecos region of West Texas
 Round Top Mountain (Washington), in Colville National Forest,

Other places
 Roundtop Mountain, Quebec, Canada

See also
Round Top (disambiguation)

References